The following are lists of highest-grossing animated films in the United States and Canada.

Included on the list are charts of the top box-office earners, a chart of high-grossing animated films adjusted for inflation.

Animated family films have performed consistently well at the box office, with Disney films enjoying lucrative re-releases prior to the home video era. Disney also enjoyed later success with its Pixar brand, of which the Toy Story films, the Finding Nemo films, and Inside Out have been the best performers; beyond Pixar, the Shrek, Ice Age, Madagascar and Despicable Me series have met with the most success. The Jungle Book and Mickey Mouse series saw successful returns after lying dormant for decades.

List of highest-grossing animated films in Canada and the United States

Computer animation
The following is a list of highest-grossing computer animated films in the United States and Canada.

Stop-motion animation
The following is a list of highest-grossing stop motion animated films in Canada and the United States.

Traditional animated films
The following is a list of highest-grossing traditional animated films in the United States and Canada.

Anime films 
The following is a list of highest-grossing anime films in the United States and Canada.

Highest-grossing animated films adjusted for inflation
These charts were compiled based on data from Box Office Mojo, by dividing the gross by the average ticket price to calculate an estimate of the total number of admissions. Admissions better reflect the popularity of older films, since they are less susceptible to the effects of inflation.

Many of the films on this list released prior to the availability of home video have had multiple releases. Note these lists are based on 2016 prices.

Highest-grossing computer animated films adjusted for inflation

Highest-grossing stop motion animated films adjusted for inflation

Highest-grossing traditional animated films adjusted for inflation

See also
 List of highest-grossing films
 List of highest-grossing films in the United States and Canada
 List of highest-grossing animated films
 List of highest-grossing live-action/animated films
 List of highest-grossing anime films
 List of highest-grossing openings for animated films
 List of most expensive animated films

References 

United States and Canada
Lists of animated films